43 Persei is a binary star system in the northern constellation Perseus. It is visible to the naked eye as a dim, yellow-white hued star with an apparent visual magnitude of 5.28. The system is located around  distant from the Sun, based on parallax.

This is a double-lined spectroscopic binary with an orbital period of 30.4 days and an eccentricity of 0.6. The primary component is an F-type main-sequence star with a stellar classification of F5V, a star that is fusing its core hydrogen.

There are distant companions B (separation 75.5" and magnitude 10.66), C (separation 85.6" and magnitude 12.18), and D (separation 68" and magnitude 13.43).

References

F-type main-sequence stars
Spectroscopic binaries
Perseus (constellation)
Persei, A
BD+50 860
Persei, 43
024546
018453
1210